Jalan Haji Ahmad, Federal Route 238, is a federal road in Kuantan, Pahang, Malaysia. The Kilometre Zero of the Federal Route 238 is at Taman Galing junctions.

Features

At most sections, the Federal Route 238 was built under the JKR R5 road standard, with a speed limit of 90 km/h.

List of junctions

References

Malaysian Federal Roads